Geoffrey Robert Stuart Love (19 April 1889 – 6 February 1978) was an English first-class cricketer who played for Middlesex County Cricket Club in the 1920s. He was born at Islington in 1889 and died at Balquhidder, Perthshire in 1978.

References

1889 births
1978 deaths
English cricketers
Middlesex cricketers